is a Japanese retired judoka. Arai won the gold medal in judo's 70 kg division, and silver in the mixed team event, at the 2020 Summer Olympics.

Career
She competed at the 2014 Judo Grand Prix Düsseldorf, finishing third, and 2015 Judo Grand Prix Düsseldorf. She won a gold medal at the 2017 World Judo Championships in Budapest.

References

External links
 

1993 births
Living people
Japanese female judoka
World judo champions
Asian Games medalists in judo
Judoka at the 2014 Asian Games
Asian Games gold medalists for Japan
Asian Games silver medalists for Japan
Medalists at the 2014 Asian Games
Judoka at the 2020 Summer Olympics
Olympic gold medalists for Japan
Olympic silver medalists for Japan
Medalists at the 2020 Summer Olympics
Olympic judoka of Japan
Olympic medalists in judo
Sportspeople from Saitama Prefecture
21st-century Japanese women